Mount Deception is a  mountain in the Alaska Range, in Denali National Park and Preserve. The glacier-covered mountain was named by a U.S. Army crash investigation party on November 13, 1944, who were the first to ascend the mountain while investigating an airplane crash that happened in September 1944.

1944 plane crash
On September 18, 1944, a US Army C-47 which took off from Elmendorf Air Force Base in Anchorage, Alaska, en route to Ladd Army Airfield in Fairbanks, Alaska.  For reasons unknown the plane traveled off course crashing into the then unnamed peak killing all 15 passengers and 4 crew members. A 44-man rescue expedition reached the crash site in early November but a recent ten-foot snowfall exasperated efforts to find any remains.

Occupants:
Crew
Roy Proebstle (pilot)
Peter Blivens (co-pilot)
Pvt. James A. George Jr.
Carl V. Harris, civilian
Navy:
Lt (JG) Athel L. Gill
S I C Bernard J. Orgeto
Army:
CWO Floyd M. Appleman
Sgt. William E. Backus
Maj. Rudolf F. Bostelman
1st Lt. Orlando J. Buck
Cpl. Charles Sykema
Pvt. Charles E. Ellis
T-5 Maurice R. Gibbs
Pvt. Anthony Kasper
PFC Alfred S. Madison
Pvt. Howard A. Pevey
PFC Clifford E. Phillips
T-4 Timothy D. Stevens
T-5 Edward S. Stoering

References

Alaska Range
Mountains of Denali Borough, Alaska
Mountains of Denali National Park and Preserve
Mountains of Alaska
Aviation accidents and incidents in the United States in 1944